"Lumberjack" is a song by American rapper and producer Tyler, the Creator, released on June 16, 2021, as the lead single from his sixth studio album, Call Me If You Get Lost. The song samples the Gravediggaz track "2 Cups of Blood".

Background
In June 2021, various billboards would appear in locations around Los Angeles with the phrase "Call Me if You Get Lost" written on them, as well as a phone number, which upon being called, plays a voicemail of a conversation between Tyler and his mother. A week later, Tyler released a short clip titled "Side Street" to social media, which was followed by the release of "Lumberjack", alongside its self-directed music video, two days later on June 16.

Music video 
The music video, directed by Tyler (who is credited as his alter ego Wolf Haley), was released along with the single on June 16. The video opens with Tyler lounging in his bed reading a magazine. He then receives a phone call which makes him spring out of bed and begin rapping. The video cuts to scenes of him getting a manicure while laughing with his nail technician and him wearing face prosthetics in a tuxedo. The closing scene is of Tyler rapping in the middle of a blizzard, ending with the Call Me If You Get Lost jingle.

Personnel
Credits adapted from Tidal.

 Tyler Okonma – producer, composer, lyricist, associated performer, recording engineer (song's main author)
 Anthony Ian Berkeley – composer, lyricist (co-author of "2 Cups of Blood" sample used in the song)
 Arnold Hamilton – composer, lyricist (co-author of "2 Cups of Blood" sample used in the song)
 Larry Willis – composer, lyricist (co-author of "2 Cups of Blood" sample used in the song)
 Paul Huston – composer, lyricist (co-author of "2 Cups of Blood" sample used in the song)
 Robert Diggs – composer, lyricist (co-author of "2 Cups of Blood" sample used in the song)
 Ben Fletcher – assistant engineer
 Zachary Acosta – assistant engineer
 Domo Genesis – background vocal
 Lionel Boyce – background vocal
 Travis Bennett – background vocal
 Mike Bozzi – mastering engineer
 NealHPogue – mixing engineer
 Vic Wainstein – recording engineer

Charts

References

2021 singles
2021 songs
Songs written by Tyler, the Creator
Tyler, the Creator songs